10 H.M. (Short for 10 Hronia Mazi, Greek: 10 Χρόνια Μαζί; English: 10 Years Together) is an album released by Greek singer Despina Vandi starting on December 6, 2007. It is her 12th album from the beginning of her career, and her 10th  album with Phoebus.  It is also her first studio album of new material since her 2004 release of Stin Avli Tou Paradisou. The album is dedicated to the 10-year collaboration with Phoebus and features a track of the same name.  The album is a triple CD, with the first CD containing pop/rock songs, the second CD containing Modern Laika songs and third CD containing new remixes of older songs.  The album is completely written and produced by Phoebus and released by Heaven Music.  The main sponsor is WIND Hellas.

On June 24, 2008, the album was repackaged with the title 10 Hronia Mazi: It's Destiny as one disc.  The repackaged version includes the song "Destiny" by Schiller featuring Despina Vandi that was composed by Phoebus.  The one-disc repackage version features all the songs from the original first and second discs, excluding all the remixes (with the exception of "Ta Lefta" (Remix)) and disc three.

Track listing

Singles and music videos
The following singles were officially released to radio stations and made into Music Videos. Additional songs such as, "Girismos", "Se Hreiazomai", "Sindromo Sterisis" and "Kathe Mera", despite not having been released as singles, managed to gain radio airplay.

"Thelo"
"Thelo" was released on 10/10 at 10 AM to all radio stations simultaneously to celebrate the 10 years of collaboration. The song was Number 1 on the Nielsen Greece Top 20 Chart for 5 straight weeks.

"10 Hronia Mazi"
"10 Hronia Mazi" is the second single of the album which released on radio stations all over the Greece on November 16, 2007. It is about Vandi's ten year collaboration with Phoebus. The music video premiered December 7 on MAD TV.

"Agapi"
"Agapi" is the third single of the album.  The music video premiered on MAD TV on March 6, 2008.  It reached number 5 on the Greek radio airplay chart.

"Fantasou Apla"
"Fantasou Apla" is the fourth single and was released on April 24, 2008 on MAD TV in the form of a music video.   was filmed at the same time as "Agapi".

"I Gi Ki I Selini"
"I Gi Ki I Selini" is the fifth single and was released on June 17, 2008. Her performance at the "MAD Video Music Awards 2008" was used as the music video of the single.

"Destiny"
"Destiny" is a song by Schiller, with vocals by Despina Vandi. The song was released as  radio-single and was included on Vandi's repackaged CD "10 Hronia Mazi: It's Destiny". She also performed the song with Schiller on June 17, 2008 on the stage of the "MAD Video Music Awards 2008".

"Tha' Thela"
"Tha' Thela" is the seventh single and was released on September 18, 2008 on MAD TV. The music video features the live performance of the song at Love Radio party which took place on May 12, 2008.

Release history

Charts
The album went platinum, selling 30,000 copies, in its first week and made its debut at number 4 on the Greek Albums Chart beaten by Mihalis Hatzigiannis, Peggy Zina and Notis Sfakianakis.  The album placed ninth on the IFPI annual albums chart for 2007. The album re-entered the chart for one week at number 39 on 22nd week of 2008 before leaving the chart once again. The album returned on charts after the repackaging at number 10 and then spent two weeks at  number 15. Almost 4 years after its release, on the 20th week of 2011, the album re-entered at number 3 and on the 21st week it falls at 4.

Credits and personnel

Personnel
 Antonis Andreou – trombone
 Romeos Avlastimidis – violin
 Achilleas Diamantis – guitars (electrics, acoustics, twelve-strings)
 Akis Diximos – second vocals, background vocals
 Spiros Dorizas – drums
 Nektarios Georgiadis – background vocals
 Pantelis Gkertsos – guitars (electrics)
 Takis Haramis – bass
 Giorgos Hatzopoulos – guitars (acoustics, twelve-strings, electrics)
 Panos Hronopoulos – remix
 Telis Kafkas – bass
 Trifon Koutsourelis – orchestration, programming, keyboards, remix
 Giannis Lionakis – orchestration, programming, guitars (acoustics, electrics), tzoura, baglama, keyboards, remix
 DJ Luke – remix
 Giannis Mpithikotsis – bouzouki, baglama, tzoura
 Christos Mpousdoukos – violin
 Vasilis Nikolopoulos – drums, remix, snare drum
 Phoebus – music, lyrics, orchestration, programming, keyboards, pneumatic, remix
 Giorgos Roilos – percussion
 Soumka – remix
 Manos Theodosakis – trumpet
 Despina Vandi – vocals
 Thanasis Vasilopoulos – clarinet, ney
 Antonis Vlahos – orchestration, mix
 Nikos Voutouras – orchestration, mix
 Nikos Zervas – keyboards

Production
 Thodoris Hrisanthopoulos – mastering
 Trifon Koutsourelis – sound
 Vasilis Nikolopoulos – sound, mix
 Phoebus – production manager, mix
 Vaggelis Siapatis – sound, computer editing
 Giorgos Stampolis – production

Design
 Dimitris Dimitroulis – make up
 Christos Karatzolas – photo cover
 Alexandra Katsaiti – styling
 P. Koutsikos – art direction
 Stefanos Vasilakis – hair styling
 A. Vasmoulakis – art direction

Credits adapted from the album's liner notes.

See also
 Despina Vandi discography

References

External links
 Official website
 Official Despina-Phoebus Micro-site for album
 Official Phoebus website

Albums produced by Phoebus (songwriter)
Despina Vandi albums
Greek-language albums
2007 albums
Heaven Music albums